Felicia Dorothea Hemans (25 September 1793 – 16 May 1835) was an English poet (who identified as Welsh by adoption). Two of her opening lines, "The boy stood on the burning deck" and "The stately homes of England", have acquired classic status.

Early life and education

Felicia Dorothea Browne was the daughter of George Browne, who worked for his father-in-law's wine importing business and succeeded him as Tuscan and imperial consul in Liverpool, and Felicity, daughter of Benedict Paul Wagner (1718–1806), wine importer at 9 Wolstenholme Square, Liverpool and Venetian consul for that city. Hemans was the fourth of six children (three boys and three girls) to survive infancy. Her sister Harriett collaborated musically with Hemans and later edited her complete works (7 vols. with memoir, 1839). George Browne's business soon brought the family to Denbighshire in North Wales, where she spent her youth. They lived in a cottage within the grounds of Gwrych Castle near Abergele when Felicia was seven years old until she was sixteen and later moved to Bronwylfa, St. Asaph (Flintshire); she later called Wales "Land of my childhood, my home and my dead". Lydia Sigourney says of her education: 
"The nature of the education of Mrs. Hemans, was favourable to the development of her genius. A wide range of classical and poetical studies, with the acquisition of several languages, supplied both pleasant aliment and needful discipline. She required not the excitement of a more public system of culture,—for the never-resting love of knowledge was her school master."
Hemans was proficient in Welsh, French, German, Italian, Spanish and Portuguese. Her sister Harriet remarked that "One of her earliest tastes was a passion for Shakspeare, which she read, as her choicest recreation, at six years old."

Career
Hemans’ first poems, dedicated to the Prince of Wales, were published in Liverpool in 1808, when she was fourteen, arousing the interest of poet Percy Bysshe Shelley, who briefly corresponded with her. She quickly followed them up with "England and Spain" (1808) and "The Domestic Affections" (1812). 

Hemans‘ major collections, including The Forest Sanctuary (1825), Records of Woman and Songs of the Affections (1830) were popular, especially with female readers. Her last books, sacred and profane, were Scenes and Hymns of Life and National Lyrics, and Songs for Music. She was by now a well-known literary figure, highly regarded by contemporaries such as Wordsworth, and with a popular following in the United States and the United Kingdom.

Personal life
In 1812, she married Captain Alfred Hemans, an Irish army officer some years older than herself. The marriage took her away from Wales, to Daventry in Northamptonshire until 1814. During their first six years of marriage, Hemans gave birth to five sons, including G. W. Hemans and Charles Isidore Hemans, and then the couple separated. Marriage had not, however, prevented her from continuing her literary career, with several volumes of poetry being published by the respected firm of John Murray in the period after 1816, beginning with The Restoration of the Works of Art to Italy (1816) and Modern Greece (1817). Tales and Historic Scenes was the collection which came out in 1819, the year of their separation.

From 1831, Hemans lived in Dublin. At her death of dropsy, William Wordsworth, Letitia Elizabeth Landon, Lydia Huntley Sigourney and Walter Savage Landor composed memorial verses in her honour. She is buried in St. Ann's Church, Dawson Street.

Legacy

Hemans's works appeared in nineteen individual books during her lifetime. After her death in 1835, they were republished widely, usually as collections of individual lyrics and not the longer, annotated works and integrated series that made up her books. For surviving female poets, such as Caroline Norton and Letitia Elizabeth Landon, Lydia Sigourney and Frances Harper, the French Amable Tastu and German Annette von Droste-Hülshoff, she was a valued model. To many readers she offered a woman's voice confiding a woman's trials; to others, a lyricism consonant with Victorian sentimentality. Among the works, she valued most were the unfinished "Superstition and Revelation" and the pamphlet "The Sceptic," which sought an Anglicanism more attuned to world religions and women's experiences. In her most successful book, Records of Woman (1828), she chronicles the lives of women, both famous and anonymous.

Hemans' poem "The Homes of England" (1827) is the origin of the phrase "stately home", referring to an English country house.

Despite her illustrious admirers her stature as a serious poet gradually declined, partly due to her success in the literary marketplace. Her poetry was considered morally exemplary, and was often assigned to schoolchildren; as a result, Hemans came to be seen as more a poet for children rather than on the basis of her entire body of work. Schoolchildren in the U.S. were still being taught "The Landing of the Pilgrim Fathers in New England" in the middle of the 20th century. But by the 21st century, "The Stately Homes of England" refers to Noël Coward's parody, not to the once-famous poem it parodied.

However, her critical reputation has been re-examined in recent years. Her work has resumed a role in standard anthologies and in classrooms and seminars and literary studies, especially in the US. Other anthologised poems include "The Image in Lava," "Evening Prayer at a Girls' School," "I Dream of All Things Free", "Night-Blowing Flowers", "Properzia Rossi", "A Spirit's Return", "The Bride of the Greek Isle", "The Wife of Asdrubal", "The Widow of Crescentius", "The Last Song of Sappho", "Corinne at the Capitol" and "The Coronation Of Inez De Castro".

Casabianca

First published in August 1826 the poem Casabianca (also known as The Boy stood on the Burning Deck) by Hemans depicts Captain Luc-Julien-Joseph Casabianca and his 12-year-old son, Giocante, who both perished aboard the ship Orient during the Battle of the Nile. The poem was very popular from the 1850s on and was memorized in elementary schools for literary practice. Other poetic figures such as Elizabeth Bishop and Samuel Butler allude to the poem in their own works.

"'Speak, Father!' once again he cried / 'If I may yet be gone! / And'—but the booming shots replied / And fast the flames rolled on."

The poem is sung in ballad form (abab) and consists of a boy asking his father whether he had fulfilled his duties, as the ship continues to burn until the magazine catches fire. Hemans adds the following note to the poem: 'Young Casabianca, a boy about thirteen years old, son to the Admiral of the Orient, remained at his post (in the Battle of the Nile) after the ship had taken fire, and all the guns had been abandoned, and perished in the explosion of the vessel, when the flames had reached the powder.'

Martin Gardner, Michael R. Turner, and others wrote modern-day parodies that were much more upbeat and consisted of boys stuffing their faces with peanuts and bread. This contrasted sharply with the dramatic image created in Casabianca as Hemans wrote it.

England and Spain, or, Valour and Patriotism
Her second book, England and Spain, or, Valour and Patriotism, was published in 1808 and was a narrative poem honouring her brother and his military service in the Peninsular War. The poem called for an end to the tyranny of Napoleon Bonaparte and for a long-lasting peace. Multiple references to Albion, an older name for Great Britain, emphasize Hemans's patriotism.

"For this thy noble sons have spread alarms, and bade the zones resound with BRITAIN's arms!"

Female suicide in Hemans' works

Several of Hemans's characters take their own lives rather than suffer the social, political and personal consequences of their compromised situations. At Hemans's time, women writers were often torn between a choice of home or the pursuit of a literary career. Hemans herself was able to balance both roles without much public ridicule, but left hints of discontent through the themes of feminine death in her writing. The suicides of women in Hemans's poetry dwell on the same social issue that was confronted both culturally and personally during her life: the choice of caged domestication or freedom of thought and expression.

"The Bride of the Greek Isle", "The Sicilian Captive", "The Last Song of Sappho" and "Indian Woman's Death Song" are some of the most notable of Hemans' works involving women's suicides. Each poem portrays a heroine who is untimely torn from her home by a masculine force – such as pirates, Vikings, and unrequited lovers – and forced to make the decision to accept her new confines or command control over the situation. None of the heroines are complacent with the tragedies that befall them, and the women ultimately take their own lives in either a final grasp for power and expression or a means to escape victimisation.

Selected works

  Poems by Felicia Dorothea Browne (1808)
  "England and Spain" by Felicia Dorothea Browne (1808)
  The Domestic Affections and Other Poems by Felicia Dorothea Browne (1812)
  "Our Lady’s Well"
  "On the Restoration of the Works of Art to Italy" (Two editions, 1816)
  "Modern Greece" (1817)
  Translations from Camoens; and Other Poets, with Original Poetry (1818) 
  Hymns on the Works of Nature, for the Use of Children
  Records of Woman: With Other Poems
  "The Better Land"
 The Vespers of Palermo (1823, play)
  Casabianca (1826, poem)
  "Corinne at the Capitol"
  "Evening Prayer at a Girls' School"
  "A Farewell to Abbotsford"
  "The Funeral Day of Sir Walter Scott"
  "Hymn by the Sick-bed of a Mother"
  "Kindred Hearts"
  "The Last Song of Sappho"
  "Lines Written in the Memoirs of Elizabeth Smith"
  "The Rock of Cader Idris"
  "Stanzas on the Late National Calamity, On the Death of the Princess Charlotte"
  "Stanzas to the Memory of George III"
  "Thoughts During Sickness: Intellectual Powers"
  "To the Eye"
  "To the New-Born"
  "Woman on the Field of Battle"

Further reading
 "Cambridge Bibliography of English Literature," 3rd ed., 4: 351–60 (2000)
 "Oxford Dictionary of National Biography," 26: 274–77 (2004)
 "Felicia Hemans: Selected Poems, Letters, Reception Materials," ed. Susan J. Wolfson (2000)
 "Felicia Hemans: Selected Poems, Prose, and Letters," ed. Gary Kelly (2002)
 Emma Mason, "Women Poets of the Nineteenth Century" (2006)
 "Felicia Hemans: Reimagining Poetry in the Nineteenth Century," ed. Nanora Sweet & Julie Melnyk (2001)
 Paula Feldman, "The Poet and the Profits: Felicia Hemans and the Literary Marketplace," "Keats-Shelley Journal" 46 (1996): 148–76
 Peter W. Trinder, "Mrs. Hemans," U Wales Press (1984)

References

External links

, another tribute by Letitia Elizabeth Landon to a portrait by William Edward West in Fisher's Drawing Room Scrap Book, 1838.

 
 
 "The Italy of Human Beings" London Review of Books Vol. 22 No. 22 · 16 November 2000
 Felicia Hemans at A Celebration of Women Writers
 Oxford Dictionary of National Biography – Felicia Hemans
 
 
 
 Songs with text by Mrs Hemans
 Archival material at 

1793 births
1835 deaths
English women poets
Sonneteers
People from St Asaph
Women of the Regency era
19th-century English women writers
English women dramatists and playwrights
Deaths from edema
Writers from Liverpool
19th-century English poets
19th-century British dramatists and playwrights